The Vanishing Riders is a 1935 American Western film directed by Robert F. Hill.

Cast 
Bill Cody as Bill Jones
Bill Cody Jr. as Tim Lang
Ethel Jackson as Joan Stanley
Hal Taliaferro as Wolf Lawson
Donald Reed as Frank Stanley
Budd Buster as Hiram McDuff
Roger Williams as Joe Lang
Ace Cain as Kentuck (a thug)
Colin Chase as Henchman Luke

Soundtrack 
 "We're The Bandoliers" (Written by Oliver Drake)

External links 

1935 films
American black-and-white films
1935 Western (genre) films
American Western (genre) films
Films directed by Robert F. Hill
1930s English-language films
1930s American films